The Australian Institute of Business (AIB) is a graduate business school based in Adelaide, South Australia. It is registered by the Tertiary Education Quality and Standards Agency (TEQSA). AIB's programmes are accredited within the Australian Qualifications Framework. AIB is accredited to confer business degrees, offering programmes including the Master of Business Administration (MBA), Master of Management (MMgt), Doctor of Business Administration (DBA) and Doctor of Philosophy in Management (PhD).

History 
AIB began as a management consulting firm before transitioning to offer higher education. It was formerly known as the Gibaran Action Research Management Institute and later the Gibaran Learning Group. In 2011, it amalgamated as the Australian Institute of Business, combining the Gibaran Graduate School of Business, the Australian Institute of Business Administration, the Tourism Institute of Australia, and the Entrepreneurship Institute Australia.

Selva Abraham is the Founder of the Australian Institute of Business. His focus has been on Work-Based Learning, which he has extended into the concept of Work-Applied Learning. He has published four books on the subjects of work-applied learning, management and action research.

AIB is registered as a higher education provider by the Tertiary Education Quality and Standards Agency (TEQSA), the government body in Australia authorised to register institutions of higher education.

Programmes
Master of Business Administration (MBA), designed with the working adult in mind.
Master of Management (MMgt), a degree, primarily suited to working managers, that combines Master's-level coursework with an in-depth research project.
Doctor of Business Administration (DBA), a research degree designed for experienced managers.
Doctor of Philosophy in Management (PhD), a traditional doctoral qualification that allows for research to be undertaken in greater depth..

Research 

The AIB Research Centre is led by the Director of Research and brings together faculty and research degree candidates. The AIB Research Centre supports the wider development of business knowledge through its publishing arm, AIB Publications, which publishes business and management books, and the twice-yearly Gibaran Journal of Applied Research. 

The Global Centre for Work-Applied Learning (GCWAL) is an independent organisation that exists within the Australian Institute of Business. It aims to bring together practitioners, scholars and organisations committed to Work-Applied Learning (WAL).

In December 2012, AIB signed a Memorandum of Understanding with Middlesex University to allow both institutions to work together to advance Work-Applied and Work-Based Learning research. This collaboration led to the inaugural Work-Applied Learning for Change conference, where the two institutions partnered to present a conference on the techniques of Work-Based Learning (WBL). In 2015, AIB in partnership with Emerald Group Publishing launched the Journal of Work-Applied Management.

Alumni

References 

Education companies of Australia
Education in South Australia
Business schools in Australia